Saint-Bonnet-en-Champsaur is a commune in the Hautes-Alpes department in southeastern France. It was expanded in January 2013, following the merger of the former communes of Bénévent-et-Charbillac and Les Infournas.

Geography
The commune is located at the mouth of the valley of the high Drac on the major route between Gap and Grenoble (route Napoléon) next to Écrins National Park. It is 15 km from Gap over the Col Bayard and 90 km from Grenoble. The commune forms a triangle of which the base is the Drac and the apex is Queyrel Peak. The landscape is primarily mountain pasture.

Climate
Located in the Haut-Dauphiné, Saint-Bonnet-en-Champsaur's climate is a mix of the Mediterranean and alpine.

Population
The inhabitants are called Saint-Bonnetiers. The population data in the table and graph below refer to the commune of Saint-Bonnet-en-Champsaur proper, in its geography at the given years. The commune of Saint-Bonnet-en-Champsaur absorbed the former communes of Bénévent-et-Charbillac and Les Infournas in 2013.

Vivian Maier
Street photographer Vivian Maier lived and photographed in the vicinity of Saint-Bonnet-en-Champsaur and Saint-Julien-en-Champsaur. While many details of Maier's life remain unknown, she was the daughter of a French mother, Maria Jaussaud, and several times during her childhood she moved between the U.S. and France, living with her mother in the Alpine village of Saint-Bonnet-en-Champsaur near her mother's relations. In 1935, Vivian and her mother, Maria, were living in Saint-Julien-en-Champsaur and prior to 1940 returned to New York City.

See also
Communes of the Hautes-Alpes department

References

External links

 Office du Tourist Information Office
 Official site

Communes of Hautes-Alpes

Communes nouvelles of Hautes-Alpes